Songs from the Victorious City is an album in the world music genre written by Anne Dudley and Jaz Coleman, recorded in 1990 in Cairo and London. It takes its name from Cairo itself, in Arabic القاهرة (pronounced: al-Qahirah), literally "The Triumphant" or "The Victorious".

Track listing

Personnel
Anne Dudley - keyboards
Jaz Coleman - violin, cobra pipe, flute
 Rada Bedaire - nai
 Ibrahim Kowala - kawala
 Fouad Rohin - violin
 Amir Abd-el - kanun
 Aboud Abdel Al - violin
 Hossam Ramzy - percussion
 Cheikh Taha - accordion
 Gilbert Biberian - guitar
 Tareq Aakef - conductor of Cairo Strings
Technical
 Roger Dudley, Sameh Almazny - engineer
 Ted Hayton, Martin Rex (track 7) - mixing

Samples
"Songs from the Victorious City" was sampled extensively on two songs by Enigma in 1993. Both "The Eyes of Truth" and "Age of Loneliness" contains distinctive Mongolian samples most notably, Alsyn Gazryn Zereglee (Алсын газрын зэрэглээ).

External links
 

1990 albums
China Records albums
Collaborative albums
World music albums by British artists